This alphabetical list of filename extensions contains extensions of notable file formats used by multiple notable applications or services.

0–9

A–E

F–L

M–R

S–Z

See also
 List of file formats

References